"No Es Que Te Extrañe" is a song recorded by American singer Christina Aguilera for her ninth studio album, Aguilera. It was written by Aguilera, Edgar Barrera, Pablo Preciado, Yasmil Marrufo, Rafa Arcaute and Federico Vindver, and produced by the latter two. It was co-produced by Afo Verde, and vocal production was handled by Jean Rodríguez. The song was released by Sony Music Latin on September 30, 2022, as the album's fifth single.

Inspired by the domestic violence she and her mother experienced from her father in her early years, Aguilera sings about forgiving her father and setting herself free from her past. The song received positive reviews, with praise focusing on Aguilera's vocals and the song's lyrical topic. A music video depicting Aguilera's childhood was released alongside the song.

Background and composition 

"No Es Que Te Extrañe" was created during Aguilera's recording session for the album in early 2021. The song is a pasillo, a genre which originates from Colombia, and is considered the national style of music in Ecuador, where Aguilera's father is from. It is written in the key of D Major, with a moderately fast tempo of 184 beats-per-minute. The song is split into two acts: the first act is a tender ballad featuring only Aguilera's vocals and an acoustic guitar, while the second act juxtaposes the first, which features a heavy Latin beat and heightened energy.

Lyrically, Aguilera sings about getting closure for the domestic violence she and her mother dealt with in her early years from her estranged father, Fausto. She revealed that she "wrote 'No Es Que Te Extrañe' to "come full circle, accept, forgive and be set free." Aguilera revealed that the song is about "feeling closure in a peaceful way", and understanding that someone who hurt you "might have a story as well".

Release and music video 
Aguilera first teased "No Es Que Te Extrañe" on her social media, announcing the album's final part, La Luz. The song premiered on September 30, 2022, and was released commercially for digital download and on streaming platforms worldwide alongside its music video. The video was co-directed by Mike Ho and Aguilera and produced by Colin Randall. It portrays Aguilera's childhood, witnessing her father's abuse to her mother. The video parallels Aguilera's childhood with her father's, with Aguilera understanding that he may have gone through a similar situation. The video closes with the spoken word "Intro (La Luz)".

Critical reception 
"No Es Que Te Extrañe" received positive reviews from music critics, who praised Aguilera's vocals and the song's lyrics. In the official write-up for the Grammy Awards website, Bianca Gracie called "No Es Que Te Extrañe" a "somber" track that "found the artist healing her childhood trauma". Chuck Taylor – writing for Billboard — complimented the song for demonstrating that Aguilera has got the goods to rise above what so many lesser acts depend on for celebrity. AllMusic's Neil Z. Yeung considered the song "an unexpected moment of high drama that was written about finding closure and forgiveness", and praised it for its "cinematic" quality. Nick Butler from Sputnikmusic simply called it "great." The New York Times editor Kelefa Sanneh positively viewed the track's theme as "fearless". Jeff Benjamin, writer of Forbes, defines the song "one of the most stunning songs of her career so far", appreciating the "melancholy" arrangement, prizing the choice to draw from pasillo and the use of requinto guitar, in which Aguilera "speaks to distant memories and finds peace with someone with whom she has a complex history". Music critic Odi O'Malley believed "No Es Que Te Extrañe" "starts like a [typical] ballad and then becomes more passionate, more evidently Latin". The track was listed as one of the best Latin songs of 2022 by Spotify's experts.

Track listing 

'''La Luz digital single
 "Intro (La Luz)" – 0:40
 "No Es Que Te Extrañe" – 4:43

Credits and personnel 

 Writing – Christina Aguilera, Edgar Barrera, Federico Vindver, Jean Rodriguez, Pablo Preciado, Rafa Arcaute, Yasmil Marrufo
 Producing – Rafa Arcaute, Federico Vindver
 Mixing – Mike Seaberg
 Recording – Felipe Trujillo, Ray Charles Brown, Jr.
 Mastering – Jaycen Joshua
 Vocals  – Christina Aguilera
 Strings arranging and conducting – Davide Rosi, Roland Gajate

Charts

Release history

Notes

References

2022 singles
2022 songs
Christina Aguilera songs
Spanish-language songs
Songs written by Christina Aguilera
Sony Music Latin singles
2020s ballads
Songs about fathers